Free Women of Spain: Anarchism and the Struggle for the Emancipation of Women is a 1991 book by Martha Ackelsberg on feminist practices in the Spanish anarchist movement. It is supplemented by interviews the author performed with surviving members of Mujeres Libres.

Bibliography

External links 

 
 
 French translation

1991 non-fiction books
Anarchism in Spain
English-language books
Feminism and history
Feminism in Spain